Vučko Ignjatović (1909 – 26 June 1942) was a Serbian officer of the Royal Yugoslav Army who was commander of the Požega Chetnik detachment during the Second World War in Yugoslavia.

During the initial phases of the uprising in Serbia in 1941, Chetniks and Partisans led joint operations against the German occupying forces but Ignjatović doubted the intentions of the Partisans. He believed them to be a paramilitary that wanted to take power through a Communist revolution. Establishing link with Milan Kalabić, Ignjatović was one of the first Chetnik officers to be legalized by allying with forces led by Milan Nedić.

As legalized Chetnik commander, he lead Požega Detachment in capture of Nova Varoš from Yugoslav Partisans in early February 1942, alongside members of Serbian Volunteer Corps. After takeover of the town on February 6, Chetniks freed Italian soldiers captured by Partisans. After Ignjatović's commanding officer Miloš Glišić was appointed by Nedić as commander of Sandžak Military Chetnik detachment, some members of Požega Chetnik Detachment stayed in Nova Varoš and Ignjatović had an office in the town, remaining under Glišić's command. Ignjatović's troops were mostly garrisoned inside the city, whereas Sandžak detachment was located in the countryside. Ignjatović and Glišić complained to Nedić in a letter on May 1 how Italians and Germans are constantly spying on them, as well as their dissatisfaction with return of Nova Varoš to Italians, as they saw it as first step towards unification of Serbia, Montenegro and Sandžak. Ignjatović was killed by pro-Ljotić members of the Sandžak Military Chetnik detachment in Nova Varoš in early hours of July 26 1942.

References

Sources
 

1909 births
1942 deaths
Military personnel from Valjevo
Serbian soldiers
Royal Yugoslav Army personnel
Royal Yugoslav Army personnel of World War II
Chetnik personnel of World War II
Serbian people of World War II